Mugat is a village in Mukhed taluka in Nanded district of Maharashtra in India.

References

Villages in Nanded district